Miss World America 1993 was the 5th edition of the Miss World America pageant and it was held in the Abraham Chavez Theatre in El Paso, Texas and was won by Maribeth Brown of Massachusetts. She was crowned by outgoing titleholder, Sharon Belden of Florida. Brown went on to represent the United States at the Miss World 1993 Pageant in South Africa later that year. She finished in the Top 10 at Miss World. This pageant was held simultaneously with the Miss Mundo México 1993 (Miss World Mexico 1993) pageant.

Results

Placements

Delegates
The Miss World America 1993 delegates were:

 Alabama - Melissa Brewer
 Arizona - Shannessy Hakola
 Arkansas - Debe McDonald
 California - Patricia Sturla
 Colorado - Cindy Ansel
 Connecticut - Wanda Gonzalez
 District of Columbia - Kathleen Harris
 Florida -  Julianne Morris
 Georgia - Shane Phillips
 Hawaii - Paige Dunlap
 Idaho - Marquiz Hurn
 Illinois - Julie Nogal
 Indiana - Heather Gray
 Iowa - Heather Keckler
 Kansas - Mary Wagner
 Kentucky - Claudia Coffey
 Louisiana - Shannon Sullivan
 Maine - Rebeca Dudley
 Maryland - Michelle Robert
 Massachusetts - Maribeth Brown
 Michigan - Shannon Clark
 Minnesota - Marni Elias
 Mississippi - Cristy Saylor
 Missouri - Abigal Arauz
 Montana - Gina Hegg
 Nebraska - Sloan Ludwig
 New Hampshire - Jennifer de Domenico
 New Jersey - Susan Thomas
 New York - Renne Robertson
 North Carolina - Vicki Johnson
 North Dakota - Angela Holbrook
 Ohio - Raquel Eatmon
 Oklahoma - Carrie Oliver
 Pennsylvania - Trudy Scotch
 South Carolina - Audra Yolanda Wallace
 South Dakota - Nichole Taylor
 Tennessee - Shannon Perry
 Texas - Emily Vineyard
 Utah - Carol Ann Bair
 Virginia - Yu-Ping Fan
 Washington - Christine Swinehart
 West Virginia - Gretchen Kessler
 Wisconsin - Holly Henderson

Notes

Withdrawals

Crossovers
Contestants who competed in other beauty pageants:

Miss USA
1992: : Audra Yolanda Wallace (2nd Runner-Up)

References

External links
Miss World Official Website
Miss World America Official Website

1993 in the United States
World America
1993
1993 in Texas